Melanius Daniel Mullarkey (born 11 January 1992) is a Saint Lucian footballer who plays for Bala Town and the Saint Lucia national team. He plays as a defender.

Early life
Mullarkey was born on the island of Saint Lucia. His family is from Soufriere and central Castries. His family moved to the United Kingdom in 2002 when he was 10 years old. It was at this time that he gained an interest in football.

Club career
Mullarkey soon began playing in the local Sunday leagues. He was scouted by Birmingham City and stayed with the club's academy for five years before moving to Coventry City. Following his departure from Coventry City, Mullarkey traveled to Cyprus to play for AEL Limassol. He returned to the United Kingdom the following year and has played for numerous non-league clubs since then. In 2015 he had a short trial stint with Cork City of the League of Ireland Premier Division.

Mullarkey signed for Southern League Premier Division Central side Bromsgrove Sporting on 5 September 2020, following a successful trial period. Melanius then signed for fellow Southern League Premier Division Central side Redditch United on 23 October 2020  He was released by the club in May 2021.

In August 2021 he joined Cymru North side Bangor City. He left the club in December 2021 after they were suspended from Welsh domestic football.  In January 2022 he joined Cymru Premier team Bala Town.

International career
Mullarkey made his senior international debut for Saint Lucia on 16 May 2015 in a 2015 Windward Islands Tournament match against Grenada. He then competed in the team's 2018 FIFA World Cup qualification matches against Antigua and Barbuda the following month.

He was then recalled to the squad for the 2017 Windward Islands Tournament and scored his first international goal in the team's opening match, a 2–1 victory over the Saint Vincent and the Grenadines.

About representing Saint Lucia, Mullarkey said, "I wanted to play for Saint Lucia because it’s my hometown, I love my country from the bottom of my heart and playing and representing them is the best thing that will ever happen to me."

Career statistics

International

References

External links

Living people
1992 births
Saint Lucian footballers
Saint Lucia international footballers
English footballers
Saint Lucian emigrants to the United Kingdom
Saint Lucian expatriate footballers
English expatriate footballers
Association football defenders
Bedworth United F.C. players
Long Buckby A.F.C. players
Banbury United F.C. players
AEL Limassol players
Kettering Town F.C. players
Rugby Town F.C. players
Boston United F.C. players
Gresley F.C. players
Daventry Town F.C. players
Leicester Nirvana F.C. players
Hayes & Yeading United F.C. players
Hinckley A.F.C. players
Wolverhampton Sporting C.F.C. players
Bromsgrove Sporting F.C. players
Redditch United F.C. players
Bangor City F.C. players
Bala Town F.C. players
English expatriate sportspeople in Bulgaria
English expatriate sportspeople in Cyprus
Expatriate footballers in Cyprus
Expatriate footballers in Bulgaria
Cymru North players
Saint Lucian expatriate sportspeople in Bulgaria
Saint Lucian expatriate sportspeople in Cyprus